Saint Anthony Chapel is a Catholic chapel in Pittsburgh, Pennsylvania within the Diocese of Pittsburgh.

Description
Built in 1880 by Fr. Suitbert Mollinger, who was at that time pastor of Most Holy Name of Jesus Parish in the neighborhood of Troy Hill, the chapel houses 4,000 to 5,000 religious relics, making it the largest collection of relics outside the Vatican.

History
As originally planned, the building of the chapel was meant to be a joint effort between the congregation of Most Holy Name and Mollinger, who would match their contribution. However, when the parish refused to appropriate the large sum of money needed, Mollinger erected the building at his own expense with money which he had inherited from his family in Belgium. After the original dedication, additions were made to house the life-sized stations of the cross as well as the growing number of pilgrims, and so the enlarged chapel was rededicated on June 13, 1892, the feast day of Saint Anthony. Mollinger died two days later following an operation for a ruptured stomach.

Mollinger was the primary driving force behind the erection of the chapel and the collection of relics housed therein. Mollinger's great personal devotion to Saint Anthony of Padua prompted him to dedicate a chapel in his name. He made several trips to Europe in order to collect relics, an unprecedented amount of which were floating in the market at the time because of political upheavals due to the so-called Kulturkampf in Germany and the unification of Italy. Most of the 4,000 to 5,000 relics in the chapel have original certificates of authenticity, the oldest of which dates from August 12, 1716.

Because Mollinger apparently died without leaving a will, his heirs descended on the chapel and stripped it of its crystal chandeliers, black onyx altar, candelabra, and all portable items that could be sold. The chapel and its remaining contents were subsequently sold to the parishioners of Most Holy Name for $30,000, a sum  U.S. dollars.

Notable among the chapel's collection are what purport to be the complete skeletal remains of a saint named Demetrius (housed underneath the altar), the skulls of Saint Macharius and a saint named Stephana, skulls of the martyred companions of Saint Ursula, the skull of Saint Theodore, the tooth of the chapel's patron, Saint Anthony of Padua, and a thorn from the Crown of Thorns.

The chapel also houses a life-sized set of statues that depict the Way of the Cross, which were imported from Munich and made by the Royal Ecclesiastical Art Establishment of Mayer and Company.

Restoration
By the 1970s the chapel had fallen into serious disrepair and group of parishioners formed a committee to raise funds to restore it. On April 7, 1972, the pastor of Most Holy Name approached Bishop Leonard of Pittsburgh and asked for his approval for this effort. Permission was granted, and the restoration was undertaken completely by donation. By 1978 the restoration was complete.

Gallery

Notes

Sources

Further reading

External links

 St. Anthony's Chapel (official site)
 Most Holy Name of Jesus Parish

Roman Catholic chapels in the United States
Christian reliquaries
Roman Catholic Diocese of Pittsburgh
Roman Catholic churches in Pennsylvania
Roman Catholic shrines
Roman Catholic churches in Pittsburgh
Roman Catholic churches completed in 1892
19th-century Roman Catholic church buildings in the United States
Troy Hill (Pittsburgh)